I Can't Go Home is a 2007 Lebanese film and the third film directed by Joana Hadjithomas and Khalil Joreige.

This film was selected in the Atelier of the Cinefondation at the 2007 Cannes Film Festival.

Plot summary
The 2006 Lebanon war erupts, a Lebanese filmmaker woman who is in Paris for a job seeks information about the war while her husband is stuck in the conflict.

See also
A Perfect Day (2005 film)

References

External links
 Directors website

2007 films
2007 drama films
2000s Arabic-language films
2000s war drama films
Lebanese war drama films